Coyote Creek may refer to:

Streams
Coyote Creek (Calaveras County), California
Coyote Creek (Contra Costa County), California, a tributary of South San Ramon Creek
Coyote Creek (Marin County), California
Coyote Creek (Oat Creek tributary), California
Coyote Creek (Santa Clara County), California
Coyote Creek (San Mateo County), California
Coyote Creek (Yolo County), California
Coyote Creek (Ventura County), California
Coyote Creek (San Gabriel River), California
Coyote Creek (Borrego Sink), California
Coyote Creek (Long Tom River), Oregon

Other
Coyote Creek Trail, San Jose California - part of the National Recreation Trail system
Coyote Creek bicycle path, Los Angeles County, California
Coyote Creek Bridge, Lane County, Oregon
Coyote Creek State Park, New Mexico
Trails of Yellowstone National Park includes a Coyote Creek Trail

See also
Coyote Gulch (California), a stream or creek